National Fire Prevention Week is observed in the United States and Canada, during the week (from Sunday to Saturday) in which October 9 falls.

In the United States, the first Presidential proclamation of Fire Prevention Week was made in 1925 by President Calvin Coolidge. The National Fire Protection Association (NFPA) continues to be the international sponsor of the week.

In Canada, Fire Prevention Week is proclaimed annually by the Governor General.  The Saturday ending the week is also proclaimed as Fire Service Recognition Day to express appreciation for the many public services rendered by members of the Canadian fire service. While in Australia the Fire Prevention Week is usually held between April 28 to May 5.

History
The Fire Prevention Week commemorates the Great Chicago Fire. On the 40th anniversary (1911) of the Great Chicago Fire, the Fire Marshals Association of North America (FMANA); the oldest membership section of the National Fire Protection Association (NFPA), sponsored the first National Fire Prevention Day, deciding to observe the anniversary as a way to keep the public informed about the importance of fire prevention. In May 1919, when the NFPA held its 23rd annual meeting in Ottawa at the invitation of the Dominion Fire Prevention Association (DFPA), the NFPA and DFPA both passed resolutions urging governments in the United States and Canada to support the campaign for a common Fire Prevention Day. This was expanded to Fire Prevention Week in 1922. The non-profit NFPA, which has officially sponsored Fire Prevention Week since its inception, selects the annual theme for Fire Prevention Week.

In the United States, the first national Fire Prevention Day proclamation was issued by President Woodroow Wilson in 1920. When President Calvin Coolidge proclaimed the first National Fire Prevention Week on October 4–10, 1925, he noted that in the previous year some 15,000 people died from fire in the United States. Calling the loss "startling", Coolidge's proclamation stated: "This waste results from the conditions which justify a sense of shame and horror; for the greater part of it could and ought to be prevented... It is highly desirable that every effort be made to reform the conditions which have made possible so vast a destruction of the national wealth".

In Canada, the first national Fire Prevention Day proclamation was issued by the Governor-General in 1919. The earliest known provincial proclamation of Fire Prevention Day was by the Lieutenant-Governor-in-Council of Ontario in 1916. Fire Prevention Week was first proclaimed by the Governor-General in 1923. Fire Service Recognition Day was first incorporated into the Governor-General's proclamation of Fire Prevention Week in 1977.

On October 12, 1957, the NBC children's western television series, Fury, starring Peter Graves and Bobby Diamond, aired the episode "Fire Prevention Week" to acquaint youngsters with the dangers of forest fires.

Dates and other information for National Fire Prevention Week are listed on the National Fire Protection Association website each year, including the annual theme. For 2020 the dates are October 4–10, with the theme "Serve Up Fire Safety in the Kitchen!"

Noted fires
1871 Great Chicago Fire
Peshtigo Fire

References
Internal document prepared by staff of HRSDC - Fire Prevention Branch (formerly Office of the Fire Commissioner of Canada) for staff training and briefing, based on review of the following sources:
 NFPA Journal - various editions;
 NFPA Community Awareness kit;
 Minutes of the Association of Canadian Fire Marshals & Fire Commissioners (ACFM/FC), June 18–21, 1952
 Minutes of the Annual Meeting of the Dominion Fire Prevention Association (DFPA), May 19, 1919
 Minutes of the 68th Annual Meeting of the Canadian Association of Fire Chiefs (CAFC), August 22–26, 1976
 Archival copies of the Fire Prevention Day/Week Proclamations - Registrar General of Canada

Notes

External links
Fire Prevention Week

Fire prevention
October observances
Awareness weeks in the United States
Awareness weeks in Canada